The following lists events from 1994 in China.

Incumbents
General Secretary of the Communist Party: Jiang Zemin
President: Jiang Zemin 
Premier: Li Peng
Vice President: Rong Yiren 
Vice Premier: Zhu Rongji

Governors  
 Governor of Anhui Province – Fu Xishou then Hui Liangyu 
 Governor of Fujian Province – Jia Qinglin then Chen Mingyi 
 Governor of Gansu Province – Zhang Wule then Sun Ying 
 Governor of Guangdong Province – Zhu Senlin then Lu Ruihua 
 Governor of Guizhou Province – Chen Shineng then Wu Yixia
 Governor of Hainan Province – Ruan Chongwu 
 Governor of Hebei Province – Ye Liansong 
 Governor of Heilongjiang Province – Shao Qihui then Tian Fengshan 
 Governor of Henan Province – Ma Zhongchen 
 Governor of Hubei Province – Jia Zhijie then Jiang Zhuping 
 Governor of Hunan Province – Chen Bangzhu then Yang Zhengwu
 Governor of Jiangsu Province – Chen Huanyou then Zheng Silin 
 Governor of Jiangxi Province – Wu Guanzheng  
 Governor of Jilin Province – Gao Yan 
 Governor of Liaoning Province – Yue Qifeng then Wen Shizhen 
 Governor of Qinghai Province – Tian Chengping 
 Governor of Shaanxi Province – Bai Qingcai (until December), Cheng Andong (starting December)
 Governor of Shandong Province – Zhao Zhihao 
 Governor of Shanxi Province – Sun Wensheng 
 Governor of Sichuan Province – Xiao Yang then Song Baorui 
 Governor of Yunnan Province – Li Jiating 
 Governor of Zhejiang Province – Wan Xueyuan

Events

January
January 23 — Miss Chinese International Pageant 1994 Finals took place.

April
 April 17 — Chinese Jia-A League 1994 was begun.

May
 May 3 — Some scientists at Anhui use the technology of Genetic engineering to successful improve Oryza sativa.

June

China Northwest Airlines Flight 2303 - crashed

July

China Unicom, one of the world's leading mobile provider,

August

1994 Kenpeng mine disaster

September

1994 Hong Kong local elections took place on September 18. Martin Lee was elected Chairman of the Democratic Party.
Tian Mingjian incident was a mass murder incident that took place on September 20, 1994, in Beijing.

November
 November 13 — Chinese Jia-A League 1994 was ended.
 November 27 – According to Chinese government and Liaoning province official confirmed report, a Fuxin Yiyuan Dance hall caught fire in Liaoning Province, 71 persons were safed, 233 persons were human fatalities.

December
 December 8 — The 1994 Karamay fire. It took 325 people dead and 130+ people injured. It took place in the town of Karamay.

Undated
Sino-Pack, first packaging products exhibition is held.

See also
List of Chinese films of 1994
List of Hong Kong films of 1994
China at the 1994 Winter Olympics
China at the 1994 Asian Games
1994 UFO sighting in China

References

 
Years of the 20th century in China
China
1990s in China